On Ajayi Crowther Street is a 2019 graphic novel by Elnathan John and illustrated by Alaba Onajin. It was published by Cassava Republic Press.

References

2019 graphic novels
2019 Nigerian novels
Cassava Republic Press books